This is an index of lists of comedy films split by decade, nationality and subject.

By decade
List of comedy films before 1920
List of comedy films of the 1920s
List of comedy films of the 1930s
List of comedy films of the 1940s
List of comedy films of the 1950s
List of comedy films of the 1960s
List of comedy films of the 1970s
List of comedy films of the 1980s
List of comedy films of the 1990s
List of comedy films of the 2000s
List of comedy films of the 2010s
List of comedy films of the 2020s

By nationality
List of American comedy films
List of Brazilian comedy films
List of British comedy films
List of Indian comedy films
List of films based on British television series

By subject
List of comedy horror films
List of comedy–mystery films
List of romantic comedy films
List of science fiction comedy films

See also
AFI's 100 Years...100 Laughs
Lists of comedies
List of comedy television series
List of BBC sitcoms
List of comedy drama television series
List of radio comedies
List of theatrical comedies
List of highest-grossing comedy films

External links
Time Out London 100 best comedy movies
Best Comedy Movies – FilmSchoolWTF
"The 100 Greatest Comedies of All Time", BBC.com